Camargo may refer to:

Places
Bolivia:
 Camargo, Chuquisaca 
Brazil:
 Camargo, Rio Grande do Sul
Mexico:
 Camargo, Chihuahua 
 Camargo, Tamaulipas 
Spain:
 Camargo, Cantabria
United States of America:
 Camargo, Illinois
 Camargo, Kentucky 
 Camargo, Mississippi 
 Camargo, Oklahoma

People
 Ángel Camargo (born 1967), Colombian road cyclist
 Camargo Guarnieri (1907–1993), Brazilian composer
 Daniel Camargo (born 1991), Brazilian ballet dancer
 Daniel Camargo Barbosa (1930–1994) prolific Colombian serial killer and rapist
 Diego Muñoz Camargo (c. 1529–1599), Mexican historian
 Fernando Camargo (born 1977), Colombian road cyclist
 Hebe Camargo (1929–2012), Brazilian television presenter
 Hélio Ferraz de Almeida Camargo (1922–2006), Brazilian zoologist and lawyer
 Iberê Camargo, (1914–1994), Brazilian painter
 Joel Camargo (1946–2014), Brazilian professional footballer
 Johan Camargo (born 1993), Panamanian baseball player
 Luiz Camargo (born 1987), Brazilian footballer
 María Constanza Camargo, Colombian cancer epidemiologist 
 Marie-Anne de Cupis de Camargo (1710–1770), French/Belgian dancer
 Marina Camargo, Brazilian artist
 Sergio Camargo (born 1994), Canadian soccer player
 Sérgio de Camargo (1930–1990), Brazilian sculptor
 Wanessa Camargo (born 1982), Brazilian singer-songwriter

Other uses
Named after the dancer:
Camargo (ballet), 1872 ballet choreographed by Marius Petipa and composed by Ludwig Minkus
La Camargo (opera) (1878), by Charles Lecocq
La Camargo, 1897 unpublished opera by Ermanno Wolf-Ferrari; see List of operas by Wolf-Ferrari
La Camargo (1912), ballet choreographed by Adeline Genée and composed by Dora Bright
Camargo, a 1928 yacht owned by Julius Fleischmann, Jr.

Portuguese-language surnames
Spanish-language surnames